The Plutonium Files: America's Secret Medical Experiments in the Cold War is a 1999 book by Eileen Welsome. It is a history of United States government-engineered radiation experiments on unwitting Americans, based on the Pulitzer Prize–winning series Welsome wrote for The Albuquerque Tribune.

Overview
The experiments began in 1945, when Manhattan Project scientists were preparing to detonate the first atomic bomb. Radiation was known to be dangerous and the experiments were designed to ascertain the detailed effect of radiation on human health. Most of the subjects, Welsome says, were  poor, powerless, and sick.

From 1945 to 1947, 18 people were injected with plutonium by Manhattan project doctors. Ebb Cade was an unwilling participant in medical experiments that involved injection of 4.7 micrograms of Plutonium on April 10, 1945 at Oak Ridge, Tennessee. This experiment was under the supervision of Harold Hodge. Other experiments directed by the United States Atomic Energy Commission continued into the 1970s. The Plutonium Files chronicles the lives of the subjects of the secret program by naming each person involved and discussing the ethical and medical research conducted in secret by the scientists and doctors. Albert Stevens, the man who survived the highest known accumulated radiation dose in any human, four-year-old Simeon Shaw sent from Australia to the U.S. for treatment, and Elmer Allen are some of the notable subjects of the Manhattan Project program led by Dr. Joseph Gilbert Hamilton.

In Nashville, pregnant women were given radioactive mixtures. In Cincinnati, some 200 patients were irradiated over a period of 15 years. In Chicago, 102 people received injections of strontium and caesium solutions. In Massachusetts, 73 developmentally disabled children were fed oatmeal laced with radioactive tracers in an experiment sponsored by MIT and the Quaker Oats Company.  In none of these cases were the subjects informed about the nature of the procedures, and thus could not have provided informed consent.

In the book these stories are interwoven with details of more well-known radiation experiments and accidents. These include accounts of U.S. soldiers deliberately exposed to nuclear bomb blasts, families who lived downwind from atomic tests, radiation exposure in the Marshall Islands and the Japanese Lucky Dragon trawler caught in the fallout from a massive hydrogen bomb blast in 1954.

The government covered up most of these radiation mishaps until 1993, when President Bill Clinton ordered a change of policy and federal agencies then made available records dealing with human radiation experiments, as a result of Welsome's work. The resulting investigation was undertaken by the president’s Advisory Committee on Human Radiation Experiments, and it uncovered much of the material included in Welsome's book. The committee issued a controversial 1995 report which said that "wrongs were committed" but it did not condemn those who perpetrated them. The final report came out on October 3, 1995, the same day as the verdict in the O.J. Simpson case, when much of the media's attention was directed elsewhere.

Jonathan D. Moreno was a senior staff member of the committee. He wrote the 1999 book Undue Risk: Secret State Experiments on Humans, which covers some of the same ground as The Plutonium Files.

See also
 Acres of Skin
 Experimentation on prisoners
 Ruth Faden
 Harold Hodge
 Plutopia
 Unethical human experimentation in the United States

References

1999 non-fiction books
Books about diseases
Books about nuclear issues
Books about the Manhattan Project
Human subject research in the United States
Medical controversies in the United States
Plutonium
Radiation health effects research